The Colbert Combustion Turbine Plant is a combustion turbine natural gas-fired power plant operated by the Tennessee Valley Authority (TVA) near Tuscumbia, Alabama. Commissioned in 1972, it is currently the oldest gas-fired power plant operated by TVA. The site was formerly home to the Colbert Fossil Plant, a coal-fired power station which operated from 1955 to 2016.

History
Work began on the Colbert Fossil Plant, then known as the Colbert Steam Plant, on October 15, 1951. The first unit began operation on January 18, 1955. Unit 2 began operation on March 1, 1955, Unit 3 on July 29, 1955, and Unit 4 on November 4, 1955. Each of these units had a capacity of 200 megawatts. A fifth unit began operation in 1965. The combustion turbine units were added in 1972, making them the first natural-gas units in the TVA system. 

The TVA board voted to the coal-fired units at Colbert on November 14, 2013. Units 1 through 4 were retired in March 2016, with the last unit being idled on March 23, 2016. The coal plant was demolished on August 25, 2021.

See also
List of power stations in Alabama
List of power stations operated by the Tennessee Valley Authority

References

Energy infrastructure completed in 1955
Energy infrastructure completed in 1965
Energy infrastructure completed in 1972
Coal-fired power stations in Alabama
Buildings and structures in Colbert County, Alabama